The 2015–16 South Dakota State Jackrabbits women's basketball represent South Dakota State University in the 2015–16 NCAA Division I women's basketball season. The Jackrabbits, led sixteenth year head by Aaron Johnston. The Jackrabbits compete in the Summit League. They play home games in Frost Arena, in Brookings, South Dakota. They finished the season 27–7, 13–3 in Summit League play to finish in second place. They were champions of The Summit League women's tournament and earn an automatic trip to the NCAA women's tournament where they upset Miami (FL) in the first round before losing to Stanford in the second round.

Roster

Schedule

|-
!colspan=9 style="background:#003896; color:#F7D417;"| Exhibition

|-
!colspan=9 style="background:#003896; color:#F7D417;"| Non-conference regular season

|-
!colspan=9 style="background:#003896; color:#F7D417;"| The Summit League regular season

|-
!colspan=9 style="background:#003896; color:#F7D417;"| The Summit League Women's tournament

|-
!colspan=9 style="background:#003896; color:#F7D417;"| NCAA Women's tournament

Rankings

References

See also
2015–16 South Dakota State Jackrabbits men's basketball team

South Dakota State Jackrabbits women's basketball seasons
South Dakota State
South Dakota State
Jack
Jack